The 2010 Professional Golf Tour of India, titled as the 2010 Aircel Professional Golf Tour of India for sponsorship reasons, was the fourth season of the Professional Golf Tour of India.

Schedule
The following table lists official events during the 2010 season.

Order of Merit
The Order of Merit was titled as the Rolex Ranking and was based on prize money won during the season, calculated in Indian rupees.

Notes

References

Professional Golf Tour of India
Professional Golf Tour of India